Charles McCann (1899-1980) was a naturalist in India.

Charles McCann may also refer to:
Charles J. McCann (1926-2015), the first President of Evergreen State College, Olympia, Washington, USA

See also
Charles H. McCann Technical High School, North Adams, Massachusetts, USA